Yves Angelo (born 22 January 1956) is a French cinematographer, film director and screenwriter. Angelo has won the César Award for Best Cinematography three times: in 1990 for Nocturne indien, in 1992 for Tous les matins du monde, and in 1994 for Germinal.

Filmography

External links

1956 births
Living people
French film directors
French cinematographers
César Award winners
Officiers of the Ordre des Arts et des Lettres
French screenwriters